Cyril Vetter is an American songwriter with a career has spanned a variety of industries, including music, broadcasting and publishing. He owned TV and radio stations, a television production firm, newspapers as well as music recording and publishing companies. He may be best known for the popular song "Double Shot (Of My Baby's Love)", co-written with Don Smith.

Career
Vetter performed as drummer for the Greek Fountains, a 1960s group composed largely of Baton Rouge youths. As the British Invasion dominated rock and roll and Rhythm & Blues in the mid-1960s, the members wore moptop hair and Madras pants. The band was popular in the Gulf Coast region in many venues. They opened for such concert performers as The Animals, Sonny and Cher, Paul Revere and the Raiders, and the Dave Clark Five. Their Mercury Records single of "Countin' the Steps" was a regional hit with noteworthy airplay in the Southeast. In January 2010, songwriter Vetter was inducted into the Louisiana Music Hall of Fame.

"Double Shot (Of My Baby's Love)" was originally recorded by Dick Holler & the Holidays, and later recorded by The Swingin' Medallions who released it as their second single in 1966. The song became a Top 20 hit for the group, peaking at #17 on the U.S. Billboard Hot 100. The song has since been recorded by other artists, including Joe Stampley.

Vetter's most recent project was Dirtdobber Blues, a fictionalized biography of longtime friend singer/songwriter/actor Charles "Butch" Hornsby, a multimedia package complete with 14 song CD, sheet music and photographs of his artwork.

In addition to Dirtdobber Blues, (release March 2011), LSU Press has published two of Vetter's previous books. Fonville Winans' Louisiana: Politics People and Places, a biography of the legendary Louisiana photographer Fonville Winans, includes historical subjects such as Huey P. Long and unmistakably iconic Louisiana figures and locales. "The Louisiana Houses of A. Hays Town", another Vetter collaboration with Gould vividly records through drawings and photographs Town's major contributions to the vernacular of original Louisiana architecture.

Personal life

In 2003, Vetter wrote and produced Deacon John's Jump Blues, a critically acclaimed and award-winning music CD, concert video and documentary film.

A U.S. Army veteran, Vetter served in Vietnam and was awarded the Bronze Star Medal. He earned political science and law degrees from Louisiana State University. Vetter practiced law in Louisiana from 1973 to 2012.

Discography

References

External links
[ Allmusic.com: Double Shot (Of My Baby's Love)]

Year of birth missing (living people)
Living people
American male songwriters
Musicians from Baton Rouge, Louisiana
United States Army personnel of the Vietnam War
Louisiana State University alumni
United States Army soldiers